T. australis  may refer to:
 Tadarida australis, the white-striped free-tailed bat, a bat species found in Australia, Indonesia and Papua New Guinea
 Telmatobufo australis, a frog species endemic to Chile
 Terminalia australis, a large shrub or tree species found in Argentina, Paraguay and Uruguay
 Treron australis, a pigeon

See also
 Australis (disambiguation)